Anywhere but Here is the third studio album by American country music artist Chris Cagle. Released on October 4, 2005, through Capitol Records Nashville. The album produced the singles "Miss Me Baby", "Wal-Mart Parking Lot", and the title track, which was also a minor chart hit for Brice Long one year prior to the release of Cagle's version. Also featured on this album is a cover of rock band Bon Jovi's single "Wanted Dead or Alive".

This album has been released with the Copy Control protection system in some regions.

Track listing

Personnel
 Dan Agee - electric guitar
 Chris Cagle - lead vocals
 John Carroll - electric guitar
 Rich Herring - acoustic guitar
 Gary Smith - keyboards
 Michael Spriggs - acoustic guitar
 Ilya Toshinsky - electric guitar
 Steve Turner - drums, percussion
 John Willis - banjo, acoustic guitar, electric guitar
 Robert Wright - bass guitar, acoustic guitar, electric guitar, drum loops, percussion, background vocals
 Jonathan Yudkin - cello, fiddle, mandolin

Chart performance

Weekly charts

Year-end charts

References

2005 albums
Chris Cagle albums
Capitol Records Nashville albums